The Anglican Church of St Mary in Compton Dando within the English county of Somerset dates from the 14th century. It is a Grade II* listed building.

The Gothic style church was originally built in the 14th century, but has been revised several times. It has a west three stage square tower supported by diagonal buttresses. There is a peal of six bells in the tower.

There is a date of 1735 in the chancel, which is probably from one of the revisions, however most of the current fabric is from a Victorian restoration.

Inside the church is a piscina. The font and pulpit are from 1833.

The churchyard contains a sundial.

The parish is part of the benefice of Publow with Pensford, Compton Dando and Chelwood within the Diocese of Bath and Wells.

See also
 List of ecclesiastical parishes in the Diocese of Bath and Wells

References

Grade II* listed buildings in Bath and North East Somerset
Buildings and structures completed in the 14th century
Grade II* listed churches in Somerset